Guy Raz (born November 9, 1975) is a journalist, correspondent and radio host, currently working at National Public Radio (NPR). He has been described by The New York Times as "one of the most popular podcasters in history" and his podcasts have a combined monthly audience of 19.2 million downloads.

He is the co-creator of three NPR programs: TED Radio Hour, How I Built This, and NPR's first-ever children's program, Wow in the World, co-hosted with Mindy Thomas.

As a war correspondent, Raz covered the conflicts in Kosovo, Macedonia, Afghanistan, and Iraq. He has reported from more than 45 countries. Raz is also the creator of NPR's popular literary segment "Three Minute Fiction."

Education

Raz graduated from Brandeis University in 1996. He received his master's degree in history from Cambridge University in the UK. In 2008, at age 33, Raz spent a year as a Nieman journalism fellow at Harvard University where he studied classical history.

Career

1997–2000: NPR, All Things Considered
In 1997, at the age of 22, Raz joined NPR as an intern for NPR's afternoon news program All Things Considered. He eventually would work virtually every job in the newsroom from temporary production assistant to breaking news anchor.

In 1998, he served as personal research assistant to former "Murrow Boy" NPR Senior News analyst Daniel Schorr.

He then served as a general assignment reporter, covering the 2000 presidential primaries and the story behind the famous Doors song "Light My Fire" where he interviewed all surviving members of the band.

Raz also wrote for other publications during this time, mainly for the Washington City Paper, during the tenure of editor David Carr as well as  The Washington Post, among others.

Burns Fellow and RIAS Berlin Fellow 
In 1999, he was awarded a Burns Fellowship to Germany to embark on a 2-month reporting assignment. His reporting would win the Burns Award for distinguished writing. In the summer of 2000, Raz reported from Germany as a RIAS Berlin fellow. His work on German "Leitkultur" was awarded the RIAS Berlin Award.

2000–2004: NPR foreign correspondent
In mid-2000, Raz was appointed NPR's Berlin bureau chief. He covered Eastern Europe and the Balkans including the conflicts in Kosovo, Macedonia and Afghanistan. In 2002, he became NPR's London bureau chief. While in London, Raz covered stories across Europe and the Middle East including the Iraq War where he spent more than 6 months in 2003 and 2004.

2004–2006: CNN correspondent
In 2004, Raz left NPR to work as CNN's Jerusalem correspondent.

During his time at CNN, Raz covered the death of Yasser Arafat, the rise of Hamas, Israel's withdrawal from Gaza and parts of the West Bank, and the incapacitation of Israeli Prime Minister Ariel Sharon.

2006–2009: NPR defense correspondent
Following the 2 years working for CNN, Raz returned to NPR, working as the defense correspondent, covering the Pentagon and the US military.[3]

During his time at the Pentagon, Raz was awarded the Edward R. Murrow Award and the Daniel Schorr Prize for his 3-part series on military-medical evacuations from Iraq.

2009–2012: NPR, All Things Considered host
In 2009, after a sabbatical year as a Nieman Fellow at Harvard University, Raz became the weekend host of All Things Considered. He is widely credited with transforming Weekend All Things Considered when he took over as host in 2009. He created a weekly "cover story" and the popular segment "Three Minute Fiction." He created a weekly podcast of this show which was the first time an NPR newsmagazine became a podcast.[3] Raz hosted Weekend All Things Considered from 2009 to 2012. In December 2012, he stepped down from that position in order to expand the TED Radio Hour into a new weekly program to air on NPR beginning in March 2013.[5][6]

2012–present: Podcast host and professor

2013–2019: TED Radio Hour 
Beginning in 2013, Raz was the host and editorial director of the TED Radio Hour, a co-production of NPR and TED that takes listeners on a journey through the world of ideas. It is one of the most-downloaded podcasts in the United States. Raz announced he was stepping down from hosting the podcast at the end of 2019.

2016–present: How I Built This 
In September 2016, Raz started hosting a new podcast on NPR, called How I Built This about entrepreneurship. In 2017, it became one of the 20 most-downloaded podcasts in the United States.

2017–present: Wow in the World 
In May 2017, Raz created NPR's first-ever children's program. The podcast, Wow in the World, was co-created with award-winning children's host Mindy Thomas.  Raz and Thomas also created a children's production company, Tinkercast, which produces Wow in the World.

Raz is known as the "Cokie Roberts for the 4-8-year-old crowd" as the news analyst for the Breakfast Blast Newscast on Kids Place Live on SiriusXM radio.

2019–present: Wisdom from the Top 
In 2019, Raz became the host of the Luminary Podcast "Wisdom from the Top." According to Luminary Podcasts "From Guy Raz comes a chance to slide your chair into boardrooms, C-suites, and the quarters of top brass. Wisdom From the Top brings listeners into conversations with the leaders helming today’s most powerful corporations and organizations, offering direct access to the secrets, mistakes, regrets, and wins that define modern leadership."

Teaching
Raz served as a Ferris Professor of Journalism at Princeton University and taught journalism at Georgetown University and George Washington University.

Awards and achievements

Raz was awarded both the Edward R. Murrow Award and the Daniel Schorr Journalism Prize for his reporting on Iraq. His reporting has contributed to two duPont awards and one Peabody awarded to NPR. He has been a finalist for the Livingston Award four times. Other awards Raz has won include the National Headliner Award, ASCAP Deems Taylor Award and an National Association of Black Journalists award.

In 2016, he became the first podcast creator to simultaneously have three shows in the Apple Podcast chart's Top 20 shows.

At age 25, he became the youngest overseas-based bureau chief for NPR, first in Berlin, then London and the Pentagon. He also served as CNN's correspondent in Jerusalem from 2004–2006.

Personal life
Raz was born in West Covina, California and lived in Washington D.C. with his wife, Hannah Raz, who is an attorney, and their two children. He currently lives in the San Francisco Bay area.

References

American radio journalists
American talk radio hosts
Living people
Brandeis University alumni
Nieman Fellows
1975 births
American male journalists
Journalists from California
Jewish American journalists
20th-century American journalists
21st-century American journalists